Mark Gerald Mastroianni (born May 30, 1964) is a United States district judge of the United States District Court for the District of Massachusetts. He has served on the court since 2014. Prior to joining the federal bench, he was district attorney of Hampden County, Massachusetts.

Early life and education
Mastroianni graduated from Cathedral High School in Springfield, Massachusetts. He received a Bachelor of Arts degree, magna cum laude, in 1986, from the American International College. He received a Juris Doctor in 1989 from Western New England School of Law.

Legal career
He began his career in the Hampden District Attorney's Office as an Assistant District Attorney in 1990. From 1995 to 2011, he worked as an attorney in private practice as a sole practitioner, focusing his practice on criminal defense matters in State and Federal court. He then became District Attorney for Hampden County, Massachusetts, serving as the chief law enforcement officer of the county and managing an office of nearly 140 employees. Under Mastroianni, the D.A.'s Office opened an unsolved-crime unit and a DNA unit, allowing several cold cases to be solved.

Federal judicial service
When a vacancy on the U.S. District Court for the District of Massachusetts opened, Mastroianni interviewed for the position before a committee to screen and recommend possible candidates, convened by Senator Elizabeth Warren and led by former District Judge Nancy Gertner. Mastroianni submitted his application in early 2013, went through several rounds of interviews, and received the recommendation. On September 24, 2013, President Barack Obama nominated Mastroianni to serve on the court, to the seat vacated by Judge Michael Ponsor, who assumed senior status on August 15, 2011. Mastroianni was rated "well qualified" for the post by a substantial majority of the American Bar Association's Standing Committee on the Federal Judiciary. He received a hearing before the Senate Judiciary Committee on February 11, 2014. His nomination was reported out of committee by a voice vote on March 6, 2014. On May 22, 2014 Senate Majority Leader Harry Reid filed for cloture on the nomination. On June 3, 2014, the Senate invoked cloture on his nomination by a 56–39 vote. On June 4, 2014, Mastroianni was confirmed by a 92–2 vote. He received his judicial commission the following day, and was ceremonially sworn in on August 1, 2014.

Notable cases
Mastroianni presided over a trademark case involving the name "fire cider" (a mixture of herbs, apple cider vinegar, and other ingredients). After a Pittsfield, Massachusetts-based company registered the phrase as a trademark in 2012, others brought suit, contending that the phrase is a longstanding phrase in herbalism that cannot be trademarked. In 2019, Mastroianni issued a decision siding with the challengers and holding that "fire cider" is a generic term.

In 2017, Mastroianni dismissed a defamation lawsuit brought by Katherine Mae McKee against comedian Bill Cosby. After McKee accused Cosby of raping her in 1974, a Cosby representative published a public letter in 2014 questioning her credibility, prompting the woman to sue for defamation. In dismissing McKee's suit, Mastroianni held that the Free Speech Clause of the First Amendment to the United States Constitution gave broad liberty to for individuals publicly accused of misconduct to defend themselves without fear of being held liable for defamation.

Personal life
Mastroianni is married and has three daughters.

References

External links

1964 births
Living people
American International College alumni
American people of Italian descent
Judges of the United States District Court for the District of Massachusetts
Massachusetts Democrats
Massachusetts Independents
Massachusetts lawyers
United States district court judges appointed by Barack Obama
Western New England University alumni
21st-century American judges